Alton Marsters was an All-America college football running back at Dartmouth. He was known as "special delivery." Herman Olcott wrote him a letter on his deathbed.

References

American football halfbacks
Dartmouth Big Green football players
All-American college football players
Arlington High School (Massachusetts) alumni
Year of birth missing
Place of birth missing